Linjie Deng (born c. 1992 in Linfen, China) is a Chinese-American multi-media and contemporary artist.

Early life and education 
Deng was born on July 25th, 1992 in Linfen City, Shanxi Province, China. He received a bachelor of fine arts degree from Beijing City University in 2015.

Deng began painting at age six, but he gained recognition in 2015 when an art lover collected his Chinese seal and calligraphy artworks for $80,000. In the same year, he moved to New York, where he completed his master of fine arts degree from the School of Visual Arts in 2017.

Career 
In 2019, Deng designed posters for the UN Global Callout to Creatives and designed paintings with slogans including Wash Your Hands, Stay Home, Save Lives. He offered his pandemic-influenced art on the Artavita website, with all sales donated to The New York-Presbyterian Hospital’s healthcare workers. In the same year, Deng created the Yin-Yang series, a selection of contemporary calligraphy works consisting of mutually opposing and coexisting ideas: freedom and hope, hard work and luck, proud and humble. Libbie Mugrabi collected his Yin-Yang Series calligraphy in Art Basel Miami Beach.

In 2021, Deng showcased his works after experiencing Asian hate crime on the subway. That led him to SCOPE Art Fair, where he exhibited three yellow works, with one work spotlighting Stop Asian Hate; Start American Love. In addition, Deng created Make America United Again, a series directed at the Asian-American community. He has also designed  NFTs, and his NFT work was featured at the Portion Street X Pop Art Week.

In 2020, Deng was invited to his solo exhibition at Chameleon 2020. In the same year, he was a featured international level artist at the Hamptons Virtual Art Fair (HVAF). Deng’s work has also been shown in China, Carlton Fine Art Gallery New York, The Hamptons Fine Art Fair, Art Basel Miami Beach, Dream Tattoo calligraphy public show, Stop Asian Hate Campaign, The United Nations, and New York Con Artist Collection.

Solo Exhibitions   
 2022 Double Sided - Hamptons Fine Arts Fair, The Hamptons, New York. 
 2021 Yin-Yang - Art Basel, SCOPE Art Show, Miami Beach. 
 2021 Young Forever - Hamptons Fine Arts Fair, The Hamptons, New York. 
 2021 Stop Asian Hate, Start American Love - Carlton Fine Arts Gallery, Manhattan,  New York. 
 2021 Lost Museum - Carlton Fine Arts Gallery, Manhattan, New York. 
 2020 Chameleon 2020 - Southampton Arts Center, The Hamptons, New York.

Group Exhibitions   
 2023 - The Year of Rabbit Chinese Calligraphy Art Performance - Tiffany & Co., New York.
 2021 - Queer Art 1950's-2021, - Carlton Fine Arts Gallery, New York.
 2017 - I'm Gay. Would You Like To Give Me A Hug? -  Public Performance Art, Sanlitun, Beijing.

Public Speaking   
 2022 - Who Am I? - Third Annual Pride Artist Panel Museum of Arts and Design, New York.
 2017 - Togayther -  School of Visual Arts, New York.
 2015 - The Frog Can Also Jump Out of The Well -  Super Speaker TV Talk Show, Beijing Radio and Television Station.

References 

Living people
Chinese contemporary artists
1992 births
American artists of Chinese descent
School of Visual Arts alumni
Artists from Shanxi